The 40th United States Congress was a meeting of the legislative branch of the United States federal government, consisting of the United States Senate and the United States House of Representatives. It met in Washington, D.C. from March 4, 1867, to March 4, 1869, during the third and fourth years of Andrew Johnson's presidency. The apportionment of seats in the House of Representatives was based on the 1860 United States census. Both chambers had a Republican majority. In the Senate, the Republicans had the largest majority a party has ever held.

Major events 

 March 30, 1867: Alaska Purchase
 February 24, 1868: Impeachment of Andrew Johnson
 May 16, 1868: President Johnson acquitted
 May 26, 1868: President Johnson acquitted again
 November 3, 1868: 1868 presidential election: Ulysses S. Grant (R) defeated Horatio Seymour (D)
 December 25, 1868: President Johnson granted unconditional pardons to all Civil War rebels
 January 20, 1869: Elizabeth Cady Stanton was the first woman to testify before Congress

Major legislation 

 Three Military Reconstruction Acts, continued:
 March 23, 1867, ch. 6, 
 July 19, 1867, ch. 30, 
 March 11, 1868, ch. 25, 
July 27, 1868: Expatriation Act of 1868, ch. 249,

Constitutional amendments 
 July 10, 1868: Fourteenth Amendment to the United States Constitution declared ratified
 February 26, 1869: Approved an amendment to the Constitution prohibiting the federal and state governments from denying a citizen the right to vote based on that citizen's "race, color, or previous condition of servitude", and submitted it to the state legislatures for ratification
 Amendment was later ratified on February 3, 1870, becoming the Fifteenth Amendment to the United States Constitution

Treaty 

 April 29, 1868: Treaty of Fort Laramie (1868), signed
 February 16, 1869: Treaty of Fort Laramie (1868) ratified

Territories organized 

July 25, 1868: Wyoming Territory organized, Sess. 2, ch. 135,

Party summary 
The count below identifies party affiliations at the beginning of the first session of this Congress, and includes members from vacancies and newly admitted states, when they were first seated. Changes resulting from subsequent replacements are shown below in the "Changes in membership" section.

During this Congress, Arkansas, Florida, Alabama, North Carolina, Louisiana, and South Carolina were readmitted to representation in both the Senate and the House.  Georgia was readmitted with representation in the House only.

Senate

House of Representatives

Leadership

Senate 
 President: Vacant
 President pro tempore: Benjamin Wade (R)
 Republican Conference Chairman: Henry B. Anthony
 Democratic Campaign Committee Chairman: James Rood Doolittle

House of Representatives 
 Speaker:  Schuyler Colfax (R), until March 3, 1869
 Theodore M. Pomeroy (R), elected March 3, 1869. Served for 1 day.

Members 

This list is arranged by chamber, then by state. Senators are listed by class, and representatives are listed by district.

Skip to House of Representatives, below

Senate 
Senators were elected by the state legislatures every two years, with one-third beginning new six-year terms with each Congress. Preceding the names in the list below are Senate class numbers, which indicate the cycle of their election. In this Congress, Class 1 meant their term ended with this Congress, requiring re-election in 1868 or 1869; Class 2 meant their term began in the last Congress, requiring re-election in 1870 or 1871; and Class 3 meant their term began in this Congress, requiring re-election in 1872 or 1873.

Alabama 
 2. Willard Warner (R), from July 13, 1868
 3. George E. Spencer (R), from July 13, 1868

Arkansas 
 2. Alexander McDonald (R), from June 22, 1868
 3. Benjamin F. Rice (R), from June 23, 1868

California 
 1. John Conness (R)
 3. Cornelius Cole (R)

Connecticut 
 1. James Dixon (R)
 3. Orris S. Ferry (R)

Delaware 
 1. George R. Riddle (D), until March 29, 1867
  James A. Bayard Jr. (D), from April 11, 1867 
 2. Willard Saulsbury Sr. (D)

Florida 
 1. Adonijah Welch (R), from June 17, 1868
 3. Thomas W. Osborn (R), from June 25, 1868

Georgia 
 2. Vacant
 3. Vacant

Illinois 
 2. Richard Yates (R)
 3. Lyman Trumbull (R)

Indiana 
 1. Thomas A. Hendricks (D)
 3. Oliver H. P. T. Morton (R)

Iowa 
 2. James W. Grimes (R)
 3. James Harlan (R)

Kansas 
 2. Edmund G. Ross (R)
 3. Samuel C. Pomeroy (R)

Kentucky 
 2. James Guthrie (D), until February 7, 1868
  Thomas C. McCreery (D), from February 19, 1868
 3. Garrett Davis (D)

Louisiana 
 2. John S. Harris (R), from July 8, 1868
 3. William Pitt Kellogg (R), from July 9, 1868

Maine 
 1. Lot M. Morrill (R)
 2. William Pitt Fessenden (R)

Maryland 
 1. Reverdy Johnson (D), until July 10, 1868
  William Pinkney Whyte (D), from July 13, 1868
 3. George Vickers (D), from March 7, 1868

Massachusetts 
 1. Charles Sumner (R)
 2. Henry Wilson (R)

Michigan 
 1. Zachariah Chandler (R)
 2. Jacob M. Howard (R)

Minnesota 
 1. Alexander Ramsey (R)
 2. Daniel S. Norton (R)

Mississippi 
 1. Vacant
 2. Vacant

Missouri 
 1. John B. Henderson (R)
 3. Charles D. Drake (R)

Nebraska 
 1. Thomas Tipton (R)
 2. John M. Thayer (R)

Nevada 
 1. William M. Stewart (R)
 3. James W. Nye (R)

New Hampshire 
 2. Aaron H. Cragin (R)
 3. James W. Patterson (R)

New Jersey 
 1. Frederick T. Frelinghuysen (R)
 2. Alexander G. Cattell (R)

New York 
 1. Edwin D. Morgan (R)
 3. Roscoe Conkling (R)

North Carolina 
 2. Joseph C. Abbott (R), from July 14, 1868
 3. John Pool (R), from July 14, 1868

Ohio 
 1. Benjamin Wade (R)
 3. John Sherman (R)

Oregon 
 2. George H. Williams (R)
 3. Henry W. Corbett (R)

Pennsylvania 
 1. Charles R. Buckalew (D)
 3. Simon Cameron (R)

Rhode Island 
 1. William Sprague (R)
 2. Henry B. Anthony (R)

South Carolina 
 2. Thomas J. Robertson (R), from July 15, 1868
 3. Frederick A. Sawyer (R), from July 16, 1868

Tennessee 
 1. David T. Patterson (D)
 2. Joseph S. Fowler (R)

Texas 
 1. Vacant
 2. Vacant

Vermont 
 1. George F. Edmunds (R)
 3. Justin S. Morrill (R)

Virginia 
 1. Vacant
 2. Vacant

West Virginia 
 1. Peter G. Van Winkle (R)
 2. Waitman T. Willey (R)

Wisconsin 
 1. James R. Doolittle (R)
 3. Timothy O. Howe (R)

House of Representatives 
The names of members of the House of Representatives are preceded by their district numbers.

Alabama 
  . Francis W. Kellogg (R), from July 22, 1868
  . Charles W. Buckley (R), from July 21, 1868
  . Benjamin W. Norris (R), from July 21, 1868
  . Charles W. Pierce (R), from July 21, 1868
  . John B. Callis (R), from July 21, 1868
  . Thomas Haughey (R), from July 21, 1868

Arkansas 
  . Logan H. Roots (R), from June 22, 1868
  . James M. Hinds (R), June 22, 1868 – October 22, 1868
  James T. Elliott (R), from January 13, 1869
  . Thomas Boles (R), from June 22, 1868

California 
  . Samuel B. Axtell (D)
  . William Higby (R)
  . James A. Johnson (D)

Connecticut 
  . Richard D. Hubbard (D)
  . Julius Hotchkiss (D)
  . Henry H. Starkweather (R)
  . William H. Barnum (D)

Delaware 
  . John A. Nicholson (D)

Florida 
  . Charles M. Hamilton (R), from July 1, 1868

Georgia 
  . Joseph W. Clift (R), from July 25, 1868
  . Nelson Tift (D), from July 25, 1868
  . William P. Edwards (R), from July 25, 1868
  . Samuel F. Gove (R), from July 25, 1868
  . Charles H. Prince (R), from July 25, 1868
  . Vacant
  . Pierce M. B. Young (D), from July 25, 1868

Illinois 
  . Norman B. Judd (R)
  . John F. Farnsworth (R)
  . Elihu B. Washburne (R)
  . Abner C. Harding (R)
  . Ebon C. Ingersoll (R)
  . Burton C. Cook (R)
  . Henry P. H. Bromwell (R)
  . Shelby M. Cullom (R)
  . Lewis W. Ross (D)
  . Albert G. Burr (D)
  . Samuel S. Marshall (D)
  . Jehu Baker (R)
  . Green B. Raum (R)
  . John A. Logan (R)

Indiana 
  . William E. Niblack (D)
  . Michael C. Kerr (D)
  . Morton C. Hunter (R)
  . William S. Holman (D)
  . George W. Julian (R)
  . John Coburn (R)
  . Henry D. Washburn (R)
  . Godlove S. Orth (R)
  . Schuyler Colfax (R)
  . William Williams (R)
  . John P. C. Shanks (R)

Iowa 
  . James F. Wilson (R)
  . Hiram Price (R)
  . William B. Allison (R)
  . William Loughridge (R)
  . Grenville M. Dodge (R)
  . Asahel W. Hubbard (R)

Kansas 
  . Sidney Clarke (R)

Kentucky 
  . Lawrence S. Trimble (D)
  . Vacant
  . Elijah Hise (D), until May 8, 1867
  Jacob Golladay (D), from December 5, 1867
  . J. Proctor Knott (D)
  . Asa Grover (D)
  . Thomas L. Jones (D)
  . James B. Beck (D)
  . George M. Adams (D)
  . Samuel McKee (R), from June 22, 1868

Louisiana 
  . J. Hale Sypher (R), from July 18, 1868
  . James Mann (D), July 18, 1868 – August 26, 1868
  . Joseph P. Newsham (R), from July 18, 1868
  . Michel Vidal (R), from July 18, 1868
  . W. Jasper Blackburn (R), from July 18, 1868

Maine 
  . John Lynch (R)
  . Sidney Perham (R)
  . James G. Blaine (R)
  . John A. Peters (R)
  . Frederick A. Pike (R)

Maryland 
  . Hiram McCullough (D)
  . Stevenson Archer (D)
  . Charles E. Phelps (C)
  . Francis Thomas (R)
  . Frederick Stone (D)

Massachusetts 
  . Thomas D. Eliot (R)
  . Oakes Ames (R)
  . Ginery Twichell (R)
  . Samuel Hooper (R)
  . Benjamin F. Butler (R)
  . Nathaniel P. Banks (R)
  . George S. Boutwell (R)
  . John D. Baldwin (R)
  . William B. Washburn (R)
  . Henry L. Dawes (R)

Michigan 
  . Fernando C. Beaman (R)
  . Charles Upson (R)
  . Austin Blair (R)
  . Thomas W. Ferry (R)
  . Rowland E. Trowbridge (R)
  . John F. Driggs (R)

Minnesota 
  . William Windom (R)
  . Ignatius L. Donnelly (R)

Mississippi 
  . Vacant
  . Vacant
  . Vacant
  . Vacant
  . Vacant

Missouri 
  . William A. Pile (R)
  . Carman A. Newcomb (R)
  . Thomas E. Noell (D), until October 3, 1867
  James R. McCormick (D), from December 17, 1867
  . Joseph J. Gravely (R)
  . Joseph W. McClurg (R), until July 1868
  John H. Stover (R), from December 7, 1868
  . Robert T. Van Horn (R)
  . Benjamin F. Loan (R)
  . John F. Benjamin (R)
  . George W. Anderson (R)

Nebraska 
  . John Taffe (R)

Nevada 
  . Delos R. Ashley (R)

New Hampshire 
  . Jacob H. Ela (R)
  . Aaron F. Stevens (R)
  . Jacob Benton (R)

New Jersey 
  . William Moore (R)
  . Charles Haight (D)
  . Charles Sitgreaves (D)
  . John Hill (R)
  . George A. Halsey (R)

New York 
  . Stephen Taber (D)
  . Demas Barnes (D)
  . William E. Robinson (D)
  . John Fox (D)
  . John Morrissey (D)
  . Thomas E. Stewart (CR)
  . John W. Chanler (D)
  . James Brooks (D)
  . Fernando Wood (D)
  . William H. Robertson (R)
  . Charles H. Van Wyck (R)
  . John H. Ketcham (R)
  . Thomas Cornell (R)
  . John V. L. Pruyn (D)
  . John Augustus Griswold (R)
  . Orange Ferriss (R)
  . Calvin T. Hulburd (R)
  . James M. Marvin (R)
  . William C. Fields (R)
  . Addison H. Laflin (R)
  . Roscoe Conkling (R), until March 4, 1867
  Alexander H. Bailey (R), from November 30, 1867
  . John C. Churchill (R)
  . Dennis McCarthy (R)
  . Theodore M. Pomeroy (R)
  . William H. Kelsey (R)
  . William S. Lincoln (R)
  . Hamilton Ward Sr. (R)
  . Lewis Selye (IR)
  . Burt Van Horn (R)
  . James M. Humphrey (D)
  . Henry H. Van Aernam (R)

North Carolina 
  . John R. French (R), from July 15, 1868
  . David Heaton (R), from July 25, 1868
  . Oliver H. Dockery (R), from July 13, 1868
  . John T. Deweese (R), from July 6, 1868
  . Israel G. Lash (R), from July 20, 1868
  . Nathaniel Boyden (C), from July 13, 1868
  . Alexander H. Jones (R), from July 6, 1868

Ohio 
  . Benjamin Eggleston (R)
  . Rutherford B. Hayes (R), until July 20, 1867
  Samuel F. Cary (IR), from November 21, 1867 
  . Robert C. Schenck (R)
  . William Lawrence (R)
  . William Mungen (D)
  . Reader W. Clarke (R)
  . Samuel Shellabarger (R)
  . Cornelius S. Hamilton (R), until December 22, 1867
  John Beatty (R), from February 5, 1868
  . Ralph P. Buckland (R)
  . James M. Ashley (R)
  . John T. Wilson (R)
  . Philadelph Van Trump (D)
  . George W. Morgan (D), until June 3, 1868
  Columbus Delano (R), from June 3, 1868
  . Martin Welker (R)
  . Tobias A. Plants (R)
  . John Bingham (R)
  . Ephraim R. Eckley (R)
  . Rufus P. Spalding (R)
  . James A. Garfield (R)

Oregon 
  . Rufus Mallory (R)

Pennsylvania 
  . Samuel J. Randall (D)
  . Charles O'Neill (R)
  . Leonard Myers (R)
  . William D. Kelley (R)
  . Caleb N. Taylor (R)
  . Benjamin M. Boyer (D)
  . John M. Broomall (R)
  . J. Lawrence Getz (D)
  . Thaddeus Stevens (R), until August 11, 1868
  Oliver J. Dickey (R), from December 7, 1868
  . Henry L. Cake (R)
  . Daniel M. Van Auken (D)
  . Charles Denison (D), until June 27, 1867
  George W. Woodward (D), from November 21, 1867
  . Ulysses Mercur (R)
  . George F. Miller (R)
  . Adam J. Glossbrenner (D)
  . William H. Koontz (R)
  . Daniel J. Morrell (R)
  . Stephen F. Wilson (R)
  . Glenni W. Scofield (R)
  . Darwin A. Finney (R), until August 25, 1868
  S. Newton Pettis (R), from December 7, 1868
  . John Covode (R)
  . James K. Moorhead (R)
  . Thomas Williams (R)
  . George V. Lawrence (R)

Rhode Island 
  . Thomas Jenckes (R)
  . Nathan F. Dixon Jr. (R)

South Carolina 
  . B. Frank Whittemore (R), from July 18, 1868
  . Christopher C. Bowen (R), from July 18, 1868
  . M. Simeon Corley (R), from July 25, 1868
  . James H. Goss (R), from July 18, 1868

Tennessee 
  . Roderick R. Butler (R)
  . Horace Maynard (R)
  . William B. Stokes (R)
  . James Mullins (R)
  . John Trimble (R)
  . Samuel M. Arnell (R)
  . Isaac R. Hawkins (R)
  . David A. Nunn (R)

Texas 
  . Vacant
  . Vacant
  . Vacant
  . Vacant

Vermont 
  . Frederick E. Woodbridge (R)
  . Luke P. Poland (R)
  . Worthington C. Smith (R)

Virginia 
  . Vacant
  . Vacant
  . Vacant
  . Vacant
  . Vacant
  . Vacant
  . Vacant
  . Vacant

West Virginia 
  . Chester D. Hubbard (R)
  . Bethuel Kitchen (R)
  . Daniel Polsley (R)

Wisconsin 
  . Halbert E. Paine (R)
  . Benjamin F. Hopkins (R)
  . Amasa Cobb (R)
  . Charles A. Eldredge (D)
  . Philetus Sawyer (R)
  . Cadwallader C. Washburn (R)

Non-voting members 
  . Coles Bashford (I)
  . George M. Chilcott (R)
  . Walter A. Burleigh (R)
  . Edward D. Holbrook (D)
  . James M. Cavanaugh (D)
  . Charles P. Clever (D), from September 2, 1867 - February 20, 1869
  J. Francisco Chaves (R), from February 20, 1869
  . William H. Hooper (D)
  . Alvan Flanders (R)

Changes in membership 

The count below reflects changes from the beginning of the first session of this Congress.

Senate 
 Replacements: 3
 Democratic: 0 seat net loss
 Republican: 0 seat net gain
 Deaths: 1
 Resignations: 2
 Interim appointments: 1
 Seats from newly re-admitted states: 12
Total seats with changes: 16

|-
| Delaware (1)
| nowrap  | George R. Riddle (D)
| Died March 29, 1867.Successor appointed April 5, 1867.Appointee was subsequently elected January 19, 1869, to finish the term.
| nowrap  | James A. Bayard Jr. (D)
| April 5, 1867

|-
| Kentucky (2)
| nowrap  | James Guthrie (D)
| Resigned February 7, 1868, because of failing health.Successor elected February 19, 1868.
| nowrap  | Thomas C. McCreery (D)
| February 19, 1868

|-
| Maryland (3)
| Vacant
| Filled vacancy caused by action of the Senate in declining to permit Philip F. Thomas to qualify.Successor elected March 7, 1868.
| nowrap  | George Vickers (D)
| March 7, 1868

|-
| Florida (1)
| Vacant
| Florida re-admitted to the Union
| nowrap  | Adonijah Welch (R)
| June 17, 1868

|-
| Arkansas (2)
| rowspan=2 | Vacant
| rowspan=2  | Arkansas re-admitted to the Union
| nowrap  | Alexander McDonald (R)
| June 22, 1868

|-
| Arkansas (3)
| nowrap  | Benjamin F. Rice (R)
| June 23, 1868

|-
| Florida (3)
| Vacant
| Florida re-admitted to the Union
| nowrap  | Thomas W. Osborn (R)
| June 25, 1868

|-
| Louisiana (2)
| rowspan=2 | Vacant
| rowspan=2  | Louisiana re-admitted to the Union
| nowrap  | John S. Harris (R)
| July 8, 1868

|-
| Louisiana (3)
| nowrap  | William P. Kellogg (R)
| July 9, 1868

|-
| Alabama (2)
| rowspan=2 | Vacant
| rowspan=2  | Alabama re-admitted to the Union
| nowrap  | Willard Warner (R)
| rowspan=3 | July 13, 1868

|-
| Alabama (3)
| nowrap  | George E. Spencer (R)

|-
| Maryland (1)
| nowrap  | Reverdy Johnson (D)
| Resigned July 10, 1868, to become U.S. Ambassador to the United Kingdom of Great Britain and Ireland.Successor appointed July 13, 1868.
| nowrap  | William P. Whyte (D)

|-
| North Carolina (2)
| rowspan=2 | Vacant
| rowspan=2  | North Carolina re-admitted to the Union
| nowrap  | Joseph C. Abbott (R)
| rowspan=2 | July 14, 1868

|-
| North Carolina (3)
| nowrap  | John Pool (R)

|-
| South Carolina (2)
| rowspan=2 | Vacant
| rowspan=2  | South Carolina re-admitted to the Union
| nowrap  | Thomas J. Robertson (R)
| July 15, 1868

|-
| South Carolina (3)
| nowrap  | Frederick A. Sawyer (R)
| July 16, 1868

|}

House of Representatives 
 Replacements: 10
 Democratic: 2 seat net loss
 Republican: 0 seat net gain
 Independent Republican: 1 seat net gain
 Conservative: 0 seat net gain
 Deaths: 8
 Resignations: 3
 Contested election: 3
 Seats from re-admitted states: 32
Total seats with changes: 44

|-
| 
| Vacant
| Vacancy in term
| nowrap  | Charles P. Clever (D)
| September 2, 1867

|-
| 
| rowspan=3 | Vacant
| rowspan=3   | Arkansas re-admitted into the Union
| nowrap  | Logan H. Roots (R)
| rowspan=3 | June 22, 1868

|-
| 
| nowrap  | James M. Hinds (R)

|-
| 
| nowrap  | Thomas Boles (R)

|-
| 
| Vacant
| John D. Young presented credentials but failed to qualify.  Election was contested by McKee.
| nowrap  | Samuel McKee (R)
| June 22, 1868

|-
| 
| Vacant
| Florida re-admitted into the Union
| nowrap  | Charles M. Hamilton (R)
| July 1, 1868

|-
| 
| rowspan=5 | Vacant
| rowspan=5   | North Carolina re-admitted into the Union
| nowrap  | John T. Deweese (R)
| rowspan=2 | July 6, 1868

|-
| 
| nowrap  | Alexander H. Jones (R)

|-
| 
| nowrap  | Oliver H. Dockery (R)
| rowspan=2 | July 13, 1868

|-
| 
| nowrap  | Nathaniel Boyden (C)

|-
| 
| nowrap  | John R. French (R)
| July 15, 1868

|-
| 
| rowspan=5 | Vacant
| rowspan=5   | Louisiana re-admitted into the Union
| nowrap  | J. Hale Sypher (R)
| rowspan=5 | July 18, 1868

|-
| 
| nowrap  | James Mann (D)

|-
| 
| nowrap  | Joseph P. Newsham (R)

|-
| 
| nowrap  | Michel Vidal (R)

|-
| 
| nowrap  | W. Jasper Blackburn (R)

|-
| 
| rowspan=3 | Vacant
| rowspan=3   | South Carolina re-admitted into the Union
| nowrap  | Benjamin F. Whittemore (R)
| rowspan=3 | July 18, 1868

|-
| 
| nowrap  | Christopher C. Bowen (R)

|-
| 
| nowrap  | James H. Goss (R)

|-
| 
| Vacant
| North Carolina re-admitted into the Union
| nowrap  | Israel G. Lash (R)
| July 20, 1868

|-
| 
| rowspan=6 | Vacant
| rowspan=6   | Alabama re-admitted into the Union
| nowrap  | Charles W. Buckley (R)
| rowspan=5 | July 21, 1868

|-
| 
| nowrap  | Benjamin W. Norris (R)

|-
| 
| nowrap  | Charles W. Pierce (R)

|-
| 
| nowrap  | John B. Callis (R)

|-
| 
| nowrap  | Thomas Haughey (R)

|-
| 
| nowrap  | Francis W. Kellogg (R)
| July 22, 1868

|-
| 
| rowspan=6 | Vacant
| rowspan=6   | Georgia re-admitted into the Union
| nowrap  | Joseph W. Clift (R)
| rowspan=6 | July 25, 1868

|-
| 
| nowrap  | Nelson Tift (D)

|-
| 
| nowrap  | William P. Edwards (R)

|-
| 
| nowrap  | Samuel F. Gove (R)

|-
| 
| nowrap  | Charles H. Prince (R)

|-
| 
| nowrap  | Pierce M. B. Young (D)

|-
| 
| Vacant
| North Carolina re-admitted into the Union
| nowrap  | David Heaton (R)
| July 25, 1868

|-
| 
| Vacant
| South Carolina re-admitted into the Union
| nowrap  | Manuel S. Corley (R)
| July 25, 1868

|-
| 
| nowrap  | Roscoe Conkling (R)
| Resigned March 4, 1867, after being elected to the US Senate
| nowrap  | Alexander H. Bailey (R)
| November 30, 1867

|-
| 
| nowrap  | Elijah Hise (D)
| Died May 8, 1867
| nowrap  | Jacob Golladay (D)
| December 5, 1867

|-
| 
| nowrap  | Charles Denison (D)
| Died June 27, 1867
| nowrap  | George W. Woodward (D)
| November 21, 1867

|-
| 
| nowrap  | Rutherford B. Hayes (R)
| Resigned July 20, 1867, after being nominated Governor of Ohio
| nowrap  | Samuel F. Cary (IR)
| November 21, 1867

|-
| 
| nowrap  | Thomas E. Noell (D)
| Died October 3, 1867
| nowrap  | James R. McCormick (D)
| December 17, 1867

|-
| 
| nowrap  | Cornelius S. Hamilton (R)
| Killed by insane son December 22, 1867
| nowrap  | John Beatty (R)
| February 5, 1868

|-
| 
| nowrap  | George W. Morgan (D)
| Lost contested election June 3, 1868
| nowrap  | Columbus Delano (R)
| June 3, 1868

|-
| 
| nowrap  | Joseph W. McClurg (R)
| Resigned in July 1868
| nowrap  | John H. Stover (R)
| December 7, 1868

|-
| 
| nowrap  | Thaddeus Stevens (R)
| Died August 11, 1868
| nowrap  | Oliver J. Dickey (R)
| December 7, 1868

|-
| 
| nowrap  | Darwin A. Finney (R)
| Died August 25, 1868
| nowrap  | S. Newton Pettis (R)
| December 7, 1868

|-
| 
| nowrap  | James Mann (D)
| Died August 26, 1868
| Vacant
| Not filled this term

|-
| 
| nowrap  | James M. Hinds (R)
| Assassinated October 22, 1868
| nowrap  | James T. Elliott (R)
| January 13, 1869

|-
| 
| nowwap  | Charles P. Clever (D)
| Lost contested election February 20, 1869
| nowrap  | J. Francisco Chaves (R)
| February 20, 1869

|}

Committees

Senate

 Agriculture (Chairman: Simon Cameron; Ranking Member: Thomas W. Tipton)
 Appropriations (Chairman: Lot M. Morrill; Ranking Member: Cornelius Cole)
 Audit and Control the Contingent Expenses of the Senate (Chairman: Aaron H. Cragin; Ranking Member: Charles R. Buckalew)
 Claims (Chairman: Timothy O. Howe; Ranking Member: Justin S. Morrill)
 Commerce (Chairman: Zachariah Chandler; Ranking Member: Henry W. Corbett)
 Distributing Public Revenue Among the States (Select)
 District of Columbia (Chairman: James Harlan; Ranking Member: James W. Patterson)
 Education
 Engrossed Bills (Chairman: Joseph S. Fowler; Ranking Member: Daniel S. Norton)
 Finance (Chairman: John Sherman; Ranking Member: Alexander G. Cattell)
 Foreign Relations (Chairman: Charles Sumner; Ranking Member: Oliver P. Morton) 
 Impeachment of President Andrew Johnson (Select)
 Impeachment Trial Investigation (Select)
 Indian Affairs (Chairman: John B. Henderson; Ranking Member: John M. Thayer)
 Judiciary (Chairman: Lyman Trumbull; Ranking Member: Roscoe Conkling) 
 Manufactures (Chairman: William Sprague IV; Ranking Member: Cornelius Cole)
 Military Affairs and the Militia (Chairman: Henry Wilson; Ranking Member: Oliver P. Morton)
 Mines and Mining (Chairman: John Conness; Ranking Member: Richard Yates)
 Naval Affairs (Chairman: James W. Grimes; Ranking Member: Frederick T. Frelinghuysen)
 Ninth Census (Select)
 Ordnance and War Ships (Select) (Chairman: Jacob M. Howard; Ranking Member: Charles D. Drake)
 Pacific Railroad (Chairman: Jacob M. Howard; Ranking Member: William M. Stewart)
 Patents and the Patent Office (Chairman: Waitman T. Willey; Ranking Member: Orris S. Ferry)
 Pensions (Chairman: Peter G. Van Winkle; Ranking Member: Thomas W. Tipton)
 Post Office and Post Roads (Chairman: Alexander Ramsey; Ranking Member: James Harlan)
 Private Land Claims (Chairman: Godlove Stein Orth; Ranking Member: Daniel S. Norton)
 Public Buildings and Grounds (Chairman: William P. Fessenden; Ranking Member: Orris S. Ferry)
 Public Lands (Chairman: Samuel C. Pomeroy; Ranking Member: George H. Williams)
 Representative Reform (Select)
 Retrenchment (Chairman: George F. Edmunds; Ranking Member: James W. Patterson)
 Revision of the Laws (Chairman: Roscoe Conkling; Ranking Member: N/A)
 Revolutionary Claims (Chairman: James W. Nye; Ranking Member: David T. Patterson)
 Rules
 Tariff Regulation (Select)
 Territories (Chairman: Richard Yates; Ranking Member: Alexander Ramsey)
 Treasury Printing Bureau (Select)
 Whole

House of Representatives

 Accounts (Chairman: John M. Broomall; Ranking Member: William C. Fields)
 Agriculture (Chairman: Rowland E. Trowbridge; Ranking Member: John T. Wilson)
 Appropriations (Chairman: Thaddeus Stevens; Ranking Member: Benjamin F. Butler)
 Banking and Currency (Chairman: Theodore M. Pomeroy; Ranking Member: Norman B. Judd) 
 Claims (Chairman: John A. Bingham; Ranking Member: Amasa Cobb)
 Coinage, Weights and Measures (Chairman: William D. Kelley; Ranking Member: John Hill)
 Commerce (Chairman: Elihu B. Washburne; Ranking Member: James M. Humphrey)
 District of Columbia (Chairman: Ebon C. Ingersoll; Ranking Member: Fernando Wood)
 Education and Labor (Chairman: Jehu Baker; Ranking Member: Thomas Cornell)
 Elections (Chairman: Henry L. Dawes; Ranking Member: Burton C. Cook) 
 Expenditures in the Interior Department (Chairman: Chester D. Hubbard; Ranking Member: Ginery Twichell)
 Expenditures in the Navy Department (Chairman: Charles Upson; Ranking Member: Francis Thomas)
 Expenditures in the Post Office Department (Chairman: William A. Pile; Ranking Member: John H. Ketcham)
 Expenditures in the State Department (Chairman: Samuel M. Arnell; Ranking Member: Reader W. Clarke)
 Expenditures in the Treasury Department (Chairman: James M. Marvin; Ranking Member: Bethuel M. Kitchen)
 Expenditures in the War Department (Chairman: William Williams; Ranking Member: Charles E. Phelps)
 Expenditures on Public Buildings (Chairman: Cadwallader C. Washburn; Ranking Member: Stevenson Archer)
 Freedmen's Affairs (Chairman: Thomas D. Eliot; Ranking Member: Daniel J. Morrell)
 Foreign Affairs (Chairman: Nathaniel P. Banks; Ranking Member: Austin Blair)
 Indian Affairs (Chairman: William Windom; Ranking Member: Glenni W. Scofield)
 Invalid Pensions (Chairman: Sidney Perham; Ranking Member: George F. Miller)
 Judiciary (Chairman: James F. Wilson; Ranking Member: William Lawrence) 
 Manufactures (Chairman: Daniel J. Morrell; Ranking Member: William Moore)
 Mileage (Chairman: George W. Anderson; Ranking Member: Green B. Raum)
 Military Affairs (Chairman: James A. Garfield; Ranking Member: Green B. Raum)
 Militia (Chairman: Halbert E. Paine; Ranking Member: Austin Blair)
 Mines and Mining (Chairman: William Higby; Ranking Member: Morton C. Hunter)
 Naval Affairs (Chairman: Frederick A. Pike; Ranking Member: Thomas W. Ferry)
 Pacific Railroads (Chairman: Hiram Price; Ranking Member: Oakes Ames)
 Patents (Chairman: Thomas A. Jenckes; Ranking Member: Henry P.H. Bromwell)
 Post Office and Post Roads (Chairman: John F. Farnsworth; Ranking Member: John Lynch)
 Private Land Claims (Chairman: Godlove Stein Orth; Ranking Member: Alexander H. Bailey)
 Public Buildings and Grounds (Chairman: John Covode; Ranking Member: William Moore)
 Public Expenditures (Chairman: Calvin T. Hulburd; Ranking Member: John Coburn)
 Public Lands (Chairman: George W. Julian; Ranking Member: George W. Anderson)
 Revisal and Unfinished Business (Chairman: Luke P. Poland; Ranking Member: William Windom)
 Revolutionary Claims (Chairman: Hamilton Ward; Ranking Member: Daniel Polsley)
 Revolutionary Pensions and the War of 1812 (Chairman: Benjamin F. Loan; Ranking Member: Lewis Selye)
 Roads and Canals (Chairman: Burton C. Cook; Ranking Member: Grenville M. Dodge)
 Rules (Select) (Chairman: Schuyler Colfax; Ranking Member: James G. Blaine)
 Standards of Official Conduct
 Territories (Chairman: James M. Ashley; Ranking Member: James Mullins)
 Ways and Means (Chairman: Robert C. Schenck; Ranking Member: John A. Logan)
 Whole

Joint committees

 Conditions of Indian Tribes (Special)
 Enrolled Bills (Chairman: Rep. Stephen F. Wilson; Vice Chairman: Rep. William S. Holman)
 The Library (Chairman: John D. Baldwin; Vice Chairman: Rep. Rufus P. Spalding)
 Printing (Chairman: Rep. Addison H. Laflin; Vice Chairman: Rep. Henry L. Cake)
 Ordnance (Select) (Chairman: Rep. John A. Logan; Vice Chairman: Rep. Robert C. Schenck)
 Reorganize the Civil Service in the Departments
 Retrenchment (Chairman: Rep. Charles H. Van Wyck; Vice Chairman: Rep. Thomas A. Jenckes)
 Revise and Equalize the Pay of the Employees of Each House
 To Examine the Accounts for Repairs and Furnishing of the Executive Mansion (Chairman: Rep. Rufus P. Spalding; Vice Chairman: Rep. Adam J. Glossbrenner)

Caucuses 
 Democratic (House)
 Democratic (Senate)

Employees

Legislative branch agency directors 
 Architect of the Capitol: Edward Clark, appointed August 30, 1865
 Librarian of Congress: Ainsworth Rand Spofford

Senate 
 Chaplain of the Senate: Edgar H. Gray (Baptist)
 Secretary of the Senate: John W. Forney, until June 4, 1868
 George C. Gorham, elected June 4, 1868
 Sergeant at Arms of the Senate: George T. Brown

House of Representatives 
 Chaplain of the House: Charles B. Boynton (Congregationalist)
 Clerk of the House: Edward McPherson
 Doorkeeper of the House: Charles E. Lippincott
 Messenger to the Speaker: William D. Todd
 Postmaster of the House: William S. King
 Reading Clerks: Edward W. Barber (D) and William K. Mehaffey (R)
 Sergeant at Arms of the House: Nehemiah G. Ordway

See also 
 List of members of the United States House of Representatives in the 40th Congress by seniority
 1866 United States elections (elections leading to this Congress)
 1866–67 United States Senate elections
 1866–67 United States House of Representatives elections
 1868 United States elections (elections during this Congress, leading to the next Congress)
 1868 United States presidential election
 1868–69 United States Senate elections
 1868–69 United States House of Representatives elections

Notes

References

External links 
 Statutes at Large, 1789-1875
 Senate Journal, First Forty-three Sessions of Congress
 House Journal, First Forty-three Sessions of Congress
 Biographical Directory of the U.S. Congress
 U.S. House of Representatives: House History
 U.S. Senate: Statistics and Lists